Tom West (born 11 February 1996) is an English professional rugby union player who plays as a loosehead prop, for Leicester Tigers in Premiership Rugby.

Club career
West worked his way through Wasps’ Junior Academy while a pupil at Radley College prior to joining the Senior Academy in 2015. He made his club debut in an Anglo-Welsh Cup game at Sale Sharks, and his Premiership debut at home to Saracens in January 2018.

Despite making his league debut for Wasps in the 2017/18 season, West would spend the best part of two seasons on loan at Championship side Nottingham, making only twelve first team appearances across three seasons heading into the 2019/20 campaign. He started in the 2020 Premiership Final as Wasps finished runners up to Exeter Chiefs.

Wasps entered administration on 17 October 2022 and West was made redundant along with all other players and coaching staff.  On 19 January 2023 he was signed by Leicester Tigers until the end of the 2022-23 season.

International career
West participated in the 2015 Six Nations Under 20s Championship and 2016 Six Nations Under 20s Championship. He was a member of the England under-20 team that hosted the 2016 World Rugby Under 20 Championship and featured as a second-half replacement in the final as the hosts defeated Ireland to become junior world champions.

In January 2021 West received a call-up to the senior England squad prior to the 2021 Six Nations, after prop Joe Marler withdrew from the group for family reasons.

References

External links
Wasps Profile
ESPN Profile
Ultimate Rugby Profile

1996 births
Living people
English rugby union players
Rugby union props
Rugby union players from Norfolk
Wasps RFC players
People educated at Radley College